Igor Viktorovich Koshin (: born 27 August 1974), is a Russian politician. He served as the Governor of the Nenets Autonomous Okrug, a federal subject of Russia from 2014 until 2017. He was also the Chairman of the Assembly of Deputies of the Nenets Autonomous Okrug from 2005 to 2012.

External links
Official website 

Living people
1974 births
United Russia politicians
21st-century Russian politicians
People from the Komi Republic
Russian Roman Catholics
Governors of Nenets Autonomous Okrug
Members of the Federation Council of Russia (after 2000)